Leylan (also Romanized as Leylān) is a village in Garin Rural District, Zarrin Dasht District, Nahavand County, Hamadan Province, Iran. At the 2006 census, its population was 513, in 116 families.

References 

Populated places in Nahavand County